The Benelux Parliament (officially known as the Benelux Interparliamentary Assembly) is one of the institutions of the Benelux economic union. The Parliament was established by an agreement signed by Belgium, the Netherlands and Luxembourg on 5 November 1955, which means it had already existed for three years when the Benelux Union was signed on 3 February 1958. The Benelux Parliament provides the governments with advice on economic and cross-frontier cooperation. Its recommendations may also concern other matters if common interests or current events so dictate. The parliament also keeps the three governments informed about the opinions that move in the parliamentary assemblies from which its members originate.

In its session on 12 an 13 June 2009, the Benelux-Parliament unanimously adopted a recommendation to modernise its way of working and to review the agreement signed between the three Benelux states. After some years of discussions about the extension of the competences of the Benelux Parliament, a new agreement was signed on 20 January 2015. It strengthens the right to interpellation an improved the ways of working of the parliament. An extension of its competences to include a right of decision was not included. This new agreement changed the official name of the Parliament from the previous Benelux Interparliamentary Consultative Council to its current official name.

Members
The Benelux Parliament consists of 49 members: 21 Members of Parliament from Belgium, 21 from the Netherlands and seven from Luxembourg. The 21 Belgian members are elected from amongst both Chambers of the Belgian Federal Parliament and by the Parliaments of the Communities and Regions of Belgium. The 21 Dutch members are elected from the Senate and House of Representatives of the States General of the Netherlands. The seven Luxembourg members are elected from amongst the Chamber of Deputies of Luxembourg. There is also one acting member for each of the 49 members, who can replace that member if necessary.

The members of the Benelux Parliament are divided into four factions. The Christian faction includes members of the CD&V, CSP and N-VA from Belgium, the CDA and CU from the Netherlands, and the CSV and the ADR from Luxembourg. The socialist/green SGD/SVD faction includes members of the PS and Ecolo-Groen from Belgium, the PvdA, GL and the SP from the Netherlands, and The Greens and the LSAP from Luxembourg. The liberal faction includes members of Open Vld and MR from Belgium, the VVD and D66 from the Netherlands, and the DP from Luxembourg. The right-wing populist VB-PVV faction includes members from VB from Belgium and from the PVV from the Netherlands. The PVDA-PTB from Belgium and FvD from the Netherlands are not part of any faction.

List of members
.

Seat
The seat of the Benelux Parliament rotates among the cities of Brussels, The Hague and Luxembourg. Each of these cities hosts the plenary meetings of the Benelux Parliament for two consecutive years. The Benelux Parliament met in Luxembourg in 2013 and 2014, in Brussels in 2015 and 2016, and meets in The Hague in 2017 and 2018. The Secretariat of the Benelux Parliament is located in Brussels.

References

External links
Official website of the Benelux Parliament

Benelux
Parliamentary assemblies
1955 establishments in Europe
Belgium–Luxembourg relations
Belgium–Netherlands relations
Luxembourg–Netherlands relations
Organizations established in 1955